Pseudoseohaeicola is a Gram-negative, aerobic, pleomorphic and non-motile genus of bacteria from the family of Rhodobacteraceae with one known species (Pseudoseohaeicola caenipelagi). Pseudoseohaeicola caenipelagi has been isolated from tidal flat sediments from the South Sea in Korea.

References

Rhodobacteraceae
Bacteria genera
Monotypic bacteria genera